This list of mines in the Angola is subsidiary to the list of mines article and lists working, defunct and future mines in the country and is organised by the primary mineral output. For practical purposes stone, marble and other quarries may be included in this list.

Diamonds
Camafuca diamond mine
Catoca diamond mine
Fucauma diamond mine
Luarica diamond mine
Lulo diamond mine

Iron
Cassinga mine

References

Ango
Mines in Angola
Mines